Rachel A. Davidson is an American civil engineer and professor in the Disaster Research Center at the University of Delaware.
She is known for her research on natural disaster risk modeling, disaster risk management and civil infrastructure systems. She is a winner of the Dorothy Swanson Excellence in Teaching Award and a nominee for the Walter L. Huber Civil Engineering Research Prize.
She was the president of Society for Risk Analysis (2010-2011).

See also
Fire safety

References

External links 
 Rachel A. Davidson at University of Delaware

American civil engineers
American structural engineers
Living people
Members of the United States National Academy of Engineering
Stanford University alumni
Princeton University alumni
University of Delaware faculty
Year of birth missing (living people)